Cautaeschra is a genus of moths of the family Noctuidae. The genus was erected by George Hampson in 1910.

Species
Cautaeschra flavescens Rothschild, 1915 New Guinea
Cautaeschra ustipennis (Hampson, 1894) Nagas

References

Acontiinae